Santaella is a surname. Notable people with the surname include:

Demetrio Santaella (c. 1807 - c. 1887), Puerto Rican politician
Katty Santaella (born 1967), Venezuelan judoka
Lucia Santaella (born 1944), Brasilian PhD in semiotics
Silvana Santaella (born 1983), Venezuelan beauty pageant titleholder